This partial list of city nicknames in Nebraska compiles the aliases, sobriquets and slogans that cities in Nebraska are known by (or have been known by historically), officially and unofficially, to municipal governments, local people, outsiders or their tourism boards or chambers of commerce. City nicknames can help in establishing a civic identity, helping outsiders recognize a community or attracting people to a community because of its nickname; promote civic pride; and build community unity. Nicknames and slogans that successfully create a new community "ideology or myth" are also believed to have economic value. Their economic value is difficult to measure, but there are anecdotal reports of cities that have achieved substantial economic benefits by "branding" themselves by adopting new slogans.

Some unofficial nicknames are positive, while others are derisive. The unofficial nicknames listed here have been in use for a long time or have gained wide currency.
Cozad – Alfalfa Capital of the World
Crawford – Deer Capital of Nebraska
Dannebrog – Danish Capital of Nebraska
Eustis – Sausage Capital of Nebraska
Gibbon
Smile City
Hastings
Queen City of the Plains
Birthplace of Kool-Aid.
Kearney
K-Town
Dobytown
 Lincoln
 Hartford of the West
 Husker City
 The Star City
 Steak Capital of the World
Loup City – Polish Capital of Nebraska
North Loup – Popcorn Capital
North Platte 
 Little Chicago
 Flat Rock
Oakland – Swedish Capital of Nebraska
O'Neill – Nebraska's Irish Capital
Omaha
Big "O"
River City
Gateway to the West
Randolph – Honey Capital of the Nation
Saint Paul - Baseball Capital of Nebraska
Seward – Nebraska's 4th of July City
 South Omaha – The Magic City
Valentine – Nebraska's Heart City
Unadilla – Groundhog Capital of Nebraska

See also 
 History of Nebraska
 List of city nicknames in the United States

References

Nebraska cities and towns
Populated places in Nebraska
City nicknames